The Springfield Indians were a minor professional ice hockey franchise, originally based in West Springfield, Massachusetts and later Springfield, Massachusetts. The Indians were founding members of the American Hockey League. They were in existence for a total of 60 seasons from 1926 to 1994, with three interruptions. The Indians had two brief hiatuses from 1933 to 1935, and from 1942 to 1946. The team was known as the Syracuse Warriors from 1951 to 1954; in addition, the team was named the Springfield Kings from 1967 to 1975. The Indians won seven Calder Cup championships; six as the Indians, one in 1974 sandwiched between three consecutive from 1960 to 1962 and two consecutive in 1990 and 1991; and one as the Kings, in 1971.

Early history
The Indians had their start in the Canadian-American Hockey League in 1926. The "Can-Am", as it was called, was founded in Springfield and the Indians were one of the five initial franchises. The team was named after the Indian Motorcycle Company which was at the time, headquartered in Springfield. It was run at the time by Lester Patrick and the National Hockey League's New York Rangers, and future NHL stars such as Charlie Rayner, Earl Seibert (who after his playing days were through would be the Indians' longtime coach), Cecil Dillon and Ott Heller saw their start in Springfield uniforms. The Indians played in the Can-Am League until the 1932–33 season, having to fold thirteen games into the season. In 1935–36, Lucien Garneau transferred his Quebec Beavers franchise to Springfield, resurrecting the Indians name; the team was now associated with the NHL's Montreal Canadiens.

The Great Depression caused cutbacks all around, and the Can-Am merged with the International Hockey League to form the International-American Hockey League, which changed its name to the American Hockey League, having lost its last Canadian franchises, in 1941.

But before that time, the man who cast his shadow over the team for four decades, Boston Bruins superstar defenseman Eddie Shore, purchased the team in 1939. Industriously, he split games between the Bruins and the Indians, even going so far as to provoke a trade to the New York Americans to make the train commute easier. He retired from the NHL after that season, but played for Springfield for two more seasons. Shore's often-controversial but ever-colorful management style would permeate the team for the next 36 years and provide generations of hockey players and fans with anecdotes.

Despite early stars like Shore, Fred Thurier, Frank Beisler and Pete Kelly, success eluded the Indians on the ice. However, in the 1941–42 season, the Indians finished in first place.

Disaster struck in the following season. With World War II, the United States army requisitioned the Eastern States Coliseum, Springfield's home arena, for the war effort, leaving the Indians homeless. Shore loaned Indians players to the Buffalo Bisons for the duration, returning the players to Springfield for the 1946–47 season. However, on ice success continued to elude the team, and despite the presence of stars such as Harry Pidhirny and Jim Anderson the franchise failed to have a winning record for over a decade more, including a temporary franchise relocation as the Syracuse Warriors from 1951 to 1954.

During those three seasons, Shore fielded a Springfield team in the low-minor Eastern Amateur Hockey League and later the Quebec Hockey League using the Indians name.  Led by future Boston Bruins goaltender Don Simmons, scoring leader Vern Pachal, and player–coach Doug McMurdy, the EAHL Indians finished 3rd and 1st their two seasons in the loop, but finished in last place in 1954 in the QHL, the only team in the loop ever located outside of the province of Quebec.

Meanwhile, disappointed with attendance in Syracuse, Shore moved the AHL franchise back to Springfield – disbanding the QHL team – for good for the 1955 season.  The team's few superlatives for the rest of the decade included the 1955 season – during which Ross Lowe won the only league MVP award in franchise history and Anderson was named rookie of the year – and All-Star Team citations to Eldie Kobussen at center in 1948, Billy Gooden in 1951, Lowe, Gordon Tottle and Don Simmons in 1955, Gerry Ehman and Cal Gardner in 1958, and Pidhirny in 1959.

"They could have played in the NHL ... "

Matters turned around in dramatic fashion for the 1959–60 season. Behind an affiliation with the Rangers bringing stars Bill Sweeney and goaltender Marcel Paille over from Providence, and an immensely deep team with star forwards Pidhirny, Anderson, Ken Schinkel, Bruce Cline, Brian Kilrea, and defensemen Ted Harris, Kent Douglas, Noel Price and Bob McCord, the Indians led the league in the regular season three straight years and won three straight Calder Cups, losing only five playoff games in that span. Sweeney won the league scoring title three years in a row, Paille the best goaltending record two years running, and Springfield defensemen won the best defenseman award two years running.  The 1959–1962 Indians were the most dominant team the AHL has ever seen; no team before or since has ever won three Calder Cups in a row or finished first in the regular season three years in a row.  The stands in the old Coliseum were filled night after night.  The Indians of that time were so dominant that it was often said they could have made a good account of themselves in the NHL.

1959–60: Sweeney finished second in league scoring behind Fred Glover of Cleveland with 96 points, Floyd Smith finished third and Bruce Cline ninth. The Indians led the league with a 43–23–6 record, and defeated Rochester four games to one in the finals for the franchise's first Calder Cup. Sweeney was named to the First All-Star Team at center, Paille to the Second Team at goal, McCord to the Second Team at defense, Smith to the Second Team at left wing, and Parker MacDonald to the Second Team at right wing.

1960–61: Indians led the league with a 49–22–1 record, a mark unsurpassed until the 1973 season. The magnificent offense scored 344 goals, nearly a hundred more than any other team. Sweeney led the league in scoring, while Cline placed third, Kilrea fourth, Bill McCreary Sr. fifth and Anderson seventh in a show of offensive dominance unique in the history of the AHL, while Paille led the league in goaltending. The Indians became the second team in league history to go undefeated in the playoffs, sweeping the Cleveland Barons and the Hershey Bears. Paille was named to the First All-Star Team, as was Cline at right wing, McCord was awarded the Eddie Shore Award as the league's best defenseman, and Sweeney and Anderson were named to the Second Team.

1961–62: Indians led the league with a 45–22–3 record. Sweeney defended his scoring title, while Kilrea placed fourth and Anderson tenth, and Paille led the league in goaltending once more. Springfield defeated Buffalo four games to one in the finals to win its record third Calder Cup in a row. Douglas won best defenseman honors, Sweeney and Paille repeated as First Team All-Stars, and McCord and Smith were named to the Second Team again.

The expansion era and beyond
Although Sweeney led the league in scoring in 1963 for a third time, the party was over for the Indians. While they still had a winning record and an offense that led the league, the Rangers had moved Paille to Baltimore, and the team missed the playoffs that year in a tight divisional race. They continued to miss the playoffs for most of the rest of the Sixties.

In the meantime, Eddie Shore's oft-capricious and notoriously miserly ownership style caused increasing friction with his players, who staged wildcat strikes in 1966 and 1967. Representing them, a young lawyer named Alan Eagleson gained prominence, and went on to form the National Hockey League Players' Association (NHLPA).
 In consequence, Shore sold his players and leased the franchise to the Los Angeles Kings of the NHL for the 1968 season, while retaining control of the team. The Kings renamed the franchise the Springfield Kings, and changed the team's colors from their traditional blue, white and red to a purple-and-gold scheme similar to the parent team.  With Gord Labossiere, star defenseman Noel Price and goaltender Bruce Landon (a name that subsequently loomed large in Springfield hockey annals) the team had a winning record in the 1969 season, reaching the Cup finals before being swept by the Buffalo Bisons.

The following season the Kings had the benefit of a league lacking powerful teams—only Baltimore and Cleveland had winning records. The team just squeaked into the playoffs with a 29–35–8 record, winning a one-game playoff with the Quebec Aces to do it.  However, they caught fire in the playoffs.  Led by future NHL star center Butch Goring and Hockey Hall of Fame goaltender Billy Smith, the Kings steamrolled through the postseason with a sparkling 11–1 record.  They upended Cleveland in the second round before sweeping a shellshocked Providence Reds squad to win their fourth Calder Cup.  The 1971 Kings were, and remain, the team with the poorest regular season record ever to win the Calder Cup.

The following year Goring and Smith were gone, and the franchise spent two more years in the wilderness. Matters didn't improve even after the Kings moved to the brand-new Springfield Civic Center in 1972.  But in the 1974–75 season, Shore enjoyed his final hurrah. Taking full control of the team once more, Shore changed its name midseason back to the Indians and reverted to the old blue-white-red uniforms, all to popular acclaim. With a cast of no-names and a record only three games over .500, the club won its fifth Calder Cup championship (becoming only the second fourth place team ever to do so), beating the New Haven Nighthawks four games to one in the finals.  An elderly Shore sold the team after the next season, ending an era inextricably linking his name to Springfield hockey. With the sale the team moved back to The Big E Coliseum playing their games in their former home from the 1976–77 season through the 1979–80 season. Starting in October 1981 they returned to the Springfield Civic Center where they remained until they moved to Worcester as the Ice Cats in 1994.

The next fourteen years were hard ones for the once-proud franchise. Springfield went through a dizzying array of NHL affiliations, while no coach stayed longer than a single season. The revolving door did their on-ice record no good.  Over that stretch, the Indians recorded only two winning seasons and only made the playoffs four times, winning but four playoff games. There were only sporadic bright spots; a scoring title from minor-league great Bruce Boudreau in 1988, quality seasons from future NHLers Charlie Simmer and Mario Lessard in 1978, and a league-leading season in goal in 1983 from Bob Janecyk.

The 1990s and the last cups
In 1990 fortunes changed once more, in an affiliation with the New York Islanders. A gallant squad coached by ex-NHL defensive whiz Jim Roberts sneaked into the playoffs in the final week in part due to veteran minor-league goaltender Rick Knickle's (signed when injuries both in Springfield and Long Island sidelined the Indians' top three goaltenders) eight game undefeated streak, and on May 18, 1990, the team knocked off the heavily favored Rochester Americans in six games in the finals for the franchise's sixth Calder Cup. Future NHL goaltender Jeff Hackett won the playoff MVP, inspirational leader Rod Dallman provided tons of grit, while names such as Marc Bergevin, Tom Fitzgerald, team captain Rob DiMaio, Jeff Finley and Bill Berg were heard from by NHL fans for many years to come.

In the middle of a dispute over leasing at the Springfield Civic Center, the Indians' home for much of the previous two decades, the team's affiliation changed again to the Hartford Whalers. The fans were very angry at the loss of their favorites, especially since their replacements came mostly from a Binghamton Whalers team recording the worst record in league history.  However, the 1990–91 new look Indians proved their naysayers wrong. Behind Roberts' veteran coaching, they rampaged to the second best record in the league behind a powerful offense led by future NHLer Terry Yake, James Black, Chris Tancill and Michel Picard (who led the league with a franchise-record 56 goals), and a rock solid defense led by captain John Stevens and Bergevin, who had been acquired by the Whalers in an early-season trade.  In so doing, the team won the North Division regular season title, the Indians' first division title since the Cup-winning squad of 1962. Goaltender Kay Whitmore won the playoff MVP as Springfield defended their title against Rochester. The victory would be the Springfield franchise's seventh and final Calder Cup championship.

End of an era
Roberts and several stars were promoted to Hartford the following fall, and while the Indians repeated for the final time as division champions in 1992 (and in winning their seventh straight playoff series in the preliminary round of the playoffs, setting a new league record), they never again gained the finals nor thereafter had a winning record. In 1993 the Indians made the conference finals before being devastated by the eventual champion Cape Breton Oilers.  They made the playoffs again in 1994, but were eliminated in the first round by the Adirondack Red Wings.

As it turned out, this was the last game the Indians would play in Springfield.  In the fall of 1994, the franchise was bought by out-of-town interests and moved to Worcester, Massachusetts, to become the Worcester IceCats. With good will from a league with central offices across the river in West Springfield and support from league president Jack Butterfield and vice-president Gordon Anziano (both former Indians executives), longtime Indians general manager Bruce Landon secured a new franchise from the league and started play that season as the Springfield Falcons.  He was also able to land an affiliation with the Whalers, thus allowing the new team to retain most of the Whalers-owned players that had played as the Indians in the previous season.  Springfield has thus fielded a team in the AHL and its predecessors for all but seven years since 1926, and continuously since 1954.  The only city with a longer unbroken run in the AHL is Hershey, where the Bears have played continuously since joining the AHL in 1938.

The original franchise moved to Peoria, Illinois, for the 2005–06 AHL season, where it played for eight years as the Peoria Rivermen. After the 2012–13 season, the Rivermen moved to Utica, New York as the Utica Comets, then to Abbotsford, British Columbia after the 2020–21 season becoming the Abbotsford Canucks. The Canucks and the Hartford Wolf Pack (whose lineage dates back to another AHL charter member, the Providence Reds), are the oldest minor league hockey franchises still in existence. The only professional hockey franchises that are older are the Montreal Canadiens, Toronto Maple Leafs and Boston Bruins of the NHL.

The final Springfield Indian playing any significant time with the franchise active in the NHL was Rob DiMaio, who last played in the 2006 preseason with the Dallas Stars; the final Indians playing significant time with the franchise active in professional hockey were Michel Picard and Terry Yake, active respectively in the Ligue Nord-Américaine de Hockey and the Swiss Nationalliga B through the end of the 2009 season. The last player who ever wore an Indians jersey active in professional hockey was Robert Petrovicky, who played 46 games in Springfield, last active in 2016 with HK Dukla Trenčín of the Slovak Extraliga.

The market was subsequently home to the Springfield Falcons (1994–2016) and the Springfield Thunderbirds (2016–present).

Hall of Famers
List of Springfield Indians alumni later inducted into the Hockey Hall of Fame.

List of Springfield Indians alumni later inducted into the AHL Hall of Fame.

Notable NHL/WHA alumni
List of Springfield Indians alumni that played more than 100 games in Springfield, and also played at least a hundred games in the National Hockey League and/or World Hockey Association or were otherwise notable hockey executives.  ‡ – denotes a member of the Hockey Hall of Fame.

Team records
 Goals in a season: Michel Picard, 56, 1990–91
 Assists in a season: Bruce Boudreau, 74, 1987–88
 Points in a season: Boudreau, 116, 1987–88
 Penalty minutes in a season: Mick Vukota, 372, 1987–88
 Shutouts in a season: Marcel Paille, 8, 1960–61
 Career games: Jim Anderson, 943
 Career goals: Anderson, 422
 Career assists: Brian Kilrea, 442
 Career points: Anderson, 813
 Career penalty minutes: Rod Dallman, 844

These are the top ten point-scorers in franchise history.

Note: Pos = Position; GP = Games played; G = Goals; A = Assists; Pts = Points

Season-by-season results
 Springfield Indians 1926–1933 (Canadian-American Hockey League)
 Springfield Indians 1935–1936 (Canadian-American Hockey League)
 Springfield Indians 1936–1940 (International-American Hockey League)
 Springfield Indians 1940–1942
 Springfield Indians 1946–1951
 Syracuse Warriors 1951–1954 (shaded red)
 Springfield Indians 1954–1967
 Springfield Kings 1967–1974 (shaded gold)
 Springfield Indians 1974–1994

Regular seasonFirst place finishes in bold.†Defeated Quebec Aces 4–3 in a single tiebreaker game to determine final playoff position.

PlayoffsPlayoff champions in bold.†Defeated Quebec Aces 4–3 in a single tiebreaker game to determine final playoff position.

Notes

References
 Total Hockey, ed. Dan Diamond, Andrew McMeel Publishing, 1999.
 American Hockey League Official Guide and Record Book, ed. Gordon Anziano, AHL, 1989 through 1995 editions.
 Springfield Union-News'', ed. Larry McDermott, Springfield, Massachusetts.

External links
All-time player roster at hockeydb.com
Various logos of the Springfield teams over the years

 
1926 establishments in Massachusetts
1994 disestablishments in Massachusetts
Boston Bruins minor league affiliates
Canadian-American Hockey League teams
Chicago Blackhawks minor league affiliates
Defunct ice hockey teams in the United States
Hartford Whalers minor league affiliates
Ice hockey clubs established in 1926
Ice hockey teams in Massachusetts
Ice hockey teams in Syracuse, New York
Kansas City Scouts minor league affiliates
Los Angeles Kings minor league affiliates
Minnesota North Stars minor league affiliates
New York Islanders minor league affiliates
New York Rangers minor league affiliates
Philadelphia Flyers minor league affiliates
Sports clubs disestablished in 1994
Sports teams in Springfield, Massachusetts
St. Louis Blues minor league affiliates
Washington Capitals minor league affiliates
West Springfield, Massachusetts